Zamia gentryi is a species of plant in the family Zamiaceae. It is endemic to Ecuador. It is threatened by habitat loss. It is found in two locations of Carchi Province and Esmeraldas Province, Ecuador, which are located near Alto Tambo, as well as between Lita and San Lorenzo.

References

gentryi
Endemic flora of Ecuador
Vulnerable plants
Taxonomy articles created by Polbot